Misrikh Lok Sabha constituency is one of the 80 Lok Sabha (parliamentary) constituencies in Uttar Pradesh state in northern India.

Assembly segments
Presently, Misrikh Lok Sabha constituency comprises five Vidhan Sabha (legislative assembly) segments. These are:

Members of Parliament

Election results

See also
 Sitapur district
 Hardoi district
 List of Constituencies of the Lok Sabha

References

Lok Sabha constituencies in Uttar Pradesh
Politics of Hardoi district